The Blue John Cavern is one of the four show caves in Castleton, Derbyshire, England.

Description

The cavern takes its name from the semi-precious mineral Blue John, which is still mined in small amounts outside the tourist season and made locally into jewellery. The deposit itself is about 250 million years old. 

The miners who work the remaining seams are also the guides for underground public tours. The eight working seams are known as Twelve Vein, Old Dining Room, Bull Beef, New Dining Room, Five Vein, Organ Room, New Cavern and Landscape.

In 1865, Blue John Cavern was the site of the first use of magnesium to light a photograph underground. It was taken by Manchester photographer Alfred Brothers.

Blue John

In the UK Blue John, or "Derbyshire Spar", is found only in Blue John Cavern and the nearby Treak Cliff Cavern. It is a type of banded fluorite. The most common explanation for the name is that it derives from the French bleu-jaune, meaning 'blue-yellow', but other derivations have been suggested.

In popular media
"The Terror of Blue John Gap", a short horror story by Sir Arthur Conan Doyle, was probably based on this cave.

In the late 1950s, the cavern was photographed in 3D by Stanley Long of VistaScreen, for sale at the souvenir booth and through mail order. 

The cavern was featured on the 2005 TV programme Seven Natural Wonders as one of the wonders of the Midlands. The cave and jewellery production of Blue John was featured in the 2010 series of How it's Made. 

Blue John Cavern is also visited by a couple in the 2013 film Sightseers.

References

External links

 
 

Caves of Derbyshire
Show caves in the United Kingdom
Tourist attractions in Derbyshire
Tourist attractions of the Peak District
Blue John (mineral)
Fluorite mines